Kjell Ivan Konrad Grengmark (January 25, 1935 - March 6, 2022) was a Swedish curler.

He was a two-time Swedish men's curling champion (1968, 1971) and played for Sweden in two .

In 1972 he was inducted into the Swedish Curling Hall of Fame.

Teams

References

External links
 
 

1935 births
2022 deaths
Swedish male curlers
Swedish curling champions